"What a Man" is a song written by Dave Crawford, and originally recorded for Stax Records' Volt imprint by Linda Lyndell, whose recording reached number 50 on the Billboard R&B chart in 1968. The song was sampled and reinterpreted as "Whatta Man" in 1993 by the trio Salt-N-Pepa with En Vogue, which became a commercial success; reaching the top ten in Australia, New Zealand, the United Kingdom, and the United States. In 2011, German singer Lena Meyer-Landrut (credited as Lena) covered the song while retaining the original title and lyrics.

Early versions
Linda Lyndell, a white singer who had been a supporting act with James Brown and Ike & Tina Turner and then recommended to Stax Records by Otis Redding, recorded "What a Man". The song was essentially improvised by Lyndell, record producer Dave Crawford, and the Stax studio musicians in Memphis, Tennessee.  It was released as a single in 1968 with the B-side track "I Don't Know"; both songs were credited to and produced by Dave Crawford. The single entered the Billboard Hot Rhythm & Blues Singles chart on August 24, 1968, and then peaked at number 50.   The record came to the attention of white supremacists in the Ku Klux Klan, who threatened Lyndell for associating with black musicians; as a result, she largely withdrew from the music business for the next 25 years.

Laura Lee covered the song, released in 1970 as a single by the Cotillion Records with "Separation Line" as the B-side track. Lee's version earned poor sales.

Salt-N-Pepa and En Vogue version

Production
In 1993, American hip hop trio Salt-N-Pepa recorded the song retitled "Whatta Man" for Runaway Love, an EP by En Vogue, who is credited as the featured group. Hurby "Luv Bug" Azor wrote the rap lyrics and produced the version, with Cheryl James (Salt) also credited as one of the songwriters. Salt-N-Pepa sampled Lyndell's original recording and remade the song as a rap song.

En Vogue sings the refrain of the song; "Whatta man, whatta man, whatta mighty good man.", while a pregnant Cindy Herron is featured only on background vocals. "Whatta Man" was later featured on Salt-n-Pepa's 1993 album, Very Necessary. The male vocals at the beginning of the song were performed by brothers Troy and John Mitchell of the rap group 3 Feet.

Critical reception
AllMusic editor Stephen Thomas Erlewine called the song "such wonderful duet", noting that they deliver a song "so sexy it hurts". Larry Flick from Billboard wrote that the "fierce, ruling rap divas dip into their fine Very Necessary album and pull out this wickedly funky hip hop jam." He added further, "Loose and oh-so-appealing harmonies by En Vogue provide a kickin' framework for clever, lip-lickin' rhymes that melt into the track's butt-shaggin' beats. Destined to be an out-of-the-box smasheroo, single further benefits from Danny D's well-conceived remixes." James Earl Hardy from Entertainment Weekly felt in his review of En Vogue's EP, Runaway Love, that the song "prove [that] these divas have more in common with the Emotions and the Sweet Inspirations than with the Supremes." 

Dave Sholin from the Gavin Report commented, "Whatta concept, pairing these goddesses of hip-hop with a killer track and some of the best lines heard in a long time. Though it was getting a healthy number of spins in several markets late last year, it's now starting to bust big." James Hamilton from Music Weeks RM Dance Update deemed it a "cooing gritty slow rap". Gerald Martinez from New Sunday Times felt it shows that En Vogue "can rap with the best of them." A reviewer from People Magazine described it as "R&B-stoked". In an retrospective review, Pop Rescue declared it as a "fantastic collaboration" with En Vogue and a "masterpiece". Sylvia Patterson from Smash Hits gave it two out of five. James Hunter from Vibe noted that En Vogue are "sounding proud as punch to play second fiddle, furnish Salt-N-Pepa with harmonic backdrops. It's a logical collaboration: En Vogue provide the sound of true romance that the rappers can better state than demonstrate."

Commercial performance
"Whatta Man" was a major hit for Salt-N-Pepa and En Vogue, peaking at number three on the Billboard Hot 100, number seven on the UK Singles Chart and number six on the UK Dance Singles Chart. In the US, this version was certified platinum. The song was nominated for the Grammy Award for Best R&B Performance by a Duo or Group with Vocals and the American Music Award for Favorite Soul/R&B Single. "Whatta Man" was ranked number 23 on VH1's countdown of the 100 Greatest Songs of the 1990s.

Lyrics analyses
Richard Harrington of The Washington Post interprets the song as "a celebration of strong men who stay home and care for kids." Garth Baker-Fletcher, an Associate Professor of Religion from Texas College, interpreted the version's refrain as "praising a steady-thinking, family-values-yet-sexy man." Writer Keith Boykin described the song portion, "Although most men are hos / He flows on the down low / Cuz I never heard about him with another girl," as if "rather than praise his faithfulness, the artists appreciate his discretion, while tacitly acknowledging his cheating." Moreover, Boykin said that "another girl" refers to Salt-N-Pepa's considerations of "heterosexual infidelity" and as if "some women [...] were publicly excusing their men for their down low behavior."

Music videos
A music video was released on the week ending January 2, 1994 to promote the single. Tupac Shakur and Treach from Naughty by Nature make cameo appearances. The video was directed by Matthew Rolston, filmed by cinematographer Derek M. Allen and won three MTV Video Music Awards: Best Dance Video, Best R&B Video, and Best Choreography in 1994. New York magazine journalist Dinitia Smith wrote about the video: "Salt-N-Pepa  a warmth and sexual heat that make Madonna seem contrived and mechanical."

Salt-n-Pepa later recorded a variation on their own, with slightly rewritten lyrics, for another music video as the one-time segment of Monday Night Football. In the Monday music video, the two women wearing tight short-sleeved clothes, including T-shirts containing their respective logos of two opposing teams, are seen in a gym complimenting two football players of their respective teams, Republished in Contemporary Issues in Sociology of Sport (2001), edited by Andrew Yiannakis and Merrill J. Melnick. pp. 223–236. Champaign, Illinois: Human Kinetics Inc. Reference to Salt-n-Pepa version is found in pp. 232–233. one white and one black, for the men's bodies and weight training efforts. In contrast, the lyrics of the Monday Night Football music video say that "their man 'likes pushin'[,] spends quality ball with the fellas,' and 'takes a big hit, 'cause he's a real man.'" According to academic Nick Trujillo of California State University, Sacramento, the rap song may associate hypermasculinity "with combat sports such as [American] football." He further said that the standard version has the women rather choose men who do not play football but are good parental candidates and are comfortable with their masculinities, while the Monday music video "not only objectifie[s] football players as sex objects but also reinforce[s] stereotypes of black men as sexual performers and white men as loving fathers."

Impact and legacy
NME magazine ranked "Whatta Man" number 34 in their list of the "50 best songs of 1994". The Village Voice ranked it number 99 in their list of "Top Singles of the 90's" in 1999.

Awards and nominations

Track listing
 US maxi-CD single'''
 "Whatta Man" (video remix)
 "Whatta Man" (Luvbug remix)
 "Whatta Man" (12-inch Danny D remix)
 "Push It" (remix)
 "Let's Talk About AIDS"

Charts

Weekly charts

Year-end charts

Certifications

Release history

Other cover versions and uses
The television show Bill Nye the Science Guy features "Whatta Brain", a parody of this song by En Vogue parody band En Lobe, in the episode "Brain". Australian rock band New Waver covered the song in 1994 and released their cover as a cassingle. Funny or Die released a version of this song with Bruno Mars singing and acting out various scenes, such as an arm wrestling scene with many men competitors.

The song is featured in a few episodes of the sitcom Sister, Sister, and also in Brooklyn Nine-Nine.

The original Linda Lyndell version of the song was also covered by German singer Lena Meyer-Landrut as the theme song to the 2011 German film What a Man. It is featured on the Platinum edition her second studio album Good News and on the film soundtrack album. It was released on 2 September 2011 as CD single and Digital download in Germany, reaching number 21 on the German Singles Chart. A music video for the Lena version was released.

The original "What a Man" was performed in the film The Sapphires and appears on the soundtrack album. It was used as Dan Wilson's intro music when he came up to bat for the Seattle Mariners, and Eddie Murray's for the Cleveland Indians. The Salt-N-Pepa version appears in a 2016 television commercial for Walmart and Coming 2 America released on March 5, 2021.

A sub-unit of South Korean girl group I.O.I from Produce 101'' sampled the hook of the Salt-N-Pepa version for their song "Whatta Man" which was released on August 9, 2016.

References

1968 songs
1993 singles
2016 singles
American soul songs
En Vogue songs
FFRR Records singles
Lena Meyer-Landrut songs
London Records singles
Music videos directed by Matthew Rolston
Next Plateau Entertainment singles
Salt-N-Pepa songs
Songs written by Dave Crawford (musician)